Louis Chauvet (27 July 1906 in Perpignan – 18 April 1981 in Menucourt) was a 20th-century French writer and journalist, winner of the 1953 prix Interallié.

Biography 
The son of the regionalist historian Horace Chauvet, Louis Chauvet became a journalist at Temps, and Le Figaro where he mainly worked in the film department. In this capacity he was the president of the International Federation of the Film Press. Also a novelist, he was awarded the 1953 Prix Interallié published by Fammarion for L'Air sur la quatrième corde.

Works 
 1977: L'Été d'osseja, la Pensée Universelle, Prix Broquette-Gonin (literature)
 1965: La "poïétique" de Paul Valéry
 1961: Le Cinéma à travers le monde (essai) cowritten with Jean Fayard and Pierre Mazars
 1956: La Petite Acrobate de l'Helvétia
 1953: L'Air sur la quatrième corde — Prix Interallié
 1950: Le porte-plume et la camera 
 1949: Furieusement tendre
 1928: Les Sports et le droit pénal. Discours prononcé à la séance solennelle de réouverture de la Conférence des avocats stagiaires, le 14 janvier 1928

References

External links 
 Louis Chauvet on the site of the Académie française
 Louis Chauvet, Critique des Mouches et défense de Zeus on Openédition books

20th-century French writers
20th-century French male writers
20th-century French journalists
Prix Interallié winners
People from Perpignan
Winners of the Prix Broquette-Gonin (literature)
1906 births
1981 deaths
French male non-fiction writers
Le Figaro people